CB5 is the twenty-second mixtape by Moroccan-American rapper French Montana. It was released through Epic Records on November 20, 2020. The mixtape features guest appearances from Jim Jones, Lil Durk, the late Pop Smoke, Jack Harlow, the late Chinx, Rafi Malice, Max B, YoungBoy Never Broke Again, Benny the Butcher, Montana's younger brother Zak, ASAP Rocky, LGP Qua, Lil Mosey, and Currensy. On November 27, 2020, Montana released the deluxe edition of the mixtape with five additional tracks, 
but ended up taking it down a few days later for unknown reasons.

Background
The title of the mixtape is an acronym for "Coke Boys 5". It is the fifth installment of French Montana's Coke Boys mixtape series. Coke Boys is also the name of the artist's record label, which is where the name originates from. The first word also stands for "Creation of Kings Everywhere". Signed to the label, Montana had artists like Chinx and Max B, and previously Lil Durk.

Release and promotion
On October 31, 2020, French Montana confirmed on Twitter that the mixtape had been finished and ready to go, promoting some merchandise. He confirmed the release date on November 11, 2020 in an Instagram story, followed by a pre-order link back to Twitter on November 16, 2020, which revealed its official artwork. Finally, he revealed the track listing on November 18, 2020.

Singles
The mixtape's lead single, "Double G", featuring late American rapper Pop Smoke, was released on October 30, 2020. Following it, "Wave Blues", featuring American rapper Benny the Butcher, the second single, was released on November 9, 2020, which was French Montana's 36th birthday. "Hot Boy Bling", featuring American rappers Jack Harlow and Lil Durk, was sent to rhythmic contemporary radio as the third and final single on January 5, 2021.

Critical reception
DJ First Class of Revolt compared the mixtape to French Montana's previous projects, stating that it "is as solid as solid can be". Quincy of Ratings Game Music gave the mixtape a rating of a D; he praised the different patterns and each featured artist's frequency, opining that Montana "knows how to play orchestrator really well" and that "he channels his old self, he goes toe to toe with true lyricists, and he actually blesses us with hooks that will probably turn clubs upside down".

Track listing
Credits adapted from Tidal.

Personnel
Credits adapted from Tidal.

 French Montana – primary artist 
 Jim Jones – featured artist 
 Lil Durk – featured artist 
 Pop Smoke – featured artist 
 Jack Harlow – featured artist 
 Chinx – featured artist 
 Max B – featured artist 
 Rafi Malice – featured artist 
 YoungBoy Never Broke Again – featured artist 
 Benny the Butcher – featured artist 
 Zak – featured artist 
 ASAP Rocky – featured artist 
 LGP Qua – featured artist 
 Lil Mosey – featured artist 
 Currensy – featured artist 

 
Sample credits
 "Too Late" contains samples from "Long & Lost" by Florence + Machine
 "Wave Blues" contains samples from "I'll Never Love" by Michael Kiwanuka
 "Who Dat" contains samples from "Like Whaaat" by Problem, featuring Bad Lucc

Charts

Release history

References

 

 
2020 mixtape albums
French Montana albums
Albums produced by Harry Fraud
Albums produced by JetsonMade
Albums produced by Hitmaka
Albums produced by Tay Keith
Albums produced by Cardiak